Thomas Francis Clive Geary (6 May 1922 – 24 July 2004) was a New Zealand cricketer. He played one first-class match for Otago in 1940/41.

Geary was born at Dunedin in 1922 and was educated at King's High School in the city. He worked as a teacher. As well as cricket, Geary played rugby union for Otago. In later life he was a selector for the Otago cricket team. Following his death in 2004 an obituary was published in the New Zealand Cricket Annual.

References

External links
 

1922 births
2004 deaths
New Zealand cricketers
Otago cricketers
Cricketers from Dunedin